The 1952 Women's Western Open was a golf competition held at Skokie Country Club, the 23rd edition of the event. Betsy Rawls won the championship in match play competition by defeating Betty Jameson in the final match, 1 up.

Women's Western Open
Golf in Illinois
Glencoe, Illinois
Women's Western Open
Women's Western Open
Women's Western Open
Women's sports in Illinois